Destroyer of Worlds is the tenth studio album by Swedish extreme metal band Bathory. It was released on 9 October 2001, through Black Mark Production.

Background 

The album's title is taken from a famous quote by J. Robert Oppenheimer about the atomic bomb: "I am become death, destroyer of worlds", which was itself quoted from verse 32 of chapter 11 in the Bhagavad Gita, spoken by Vishnu.

Stylistically, Destroyer of Worlds is a cross between the Viking metal of Bathory's 1988–1991 period and the thrash metal style of Requiem and Octagon. It is Bathory's longest studio album.

Track listing

Personnel 

 Quorthon – All instruments

References 

Bathory (band) albums
2001 albums
Thrash metal albums by Swedish artists